Jan van Cauwelaert, C.I.C.M. (12 April 1914 – 18 August 2016) was a Belgian-Congolese bishop of the Roman Catholic Church. Upon his death at the age of 102, he was one of the oldest bishops in the Church, the oldest European-born bishop and the final living one to have been consecrated by Cardinal Jozef-Ernest van Roey.

Van Cauwelaert was born in Antwerp, Belgium in April 1914 as the youngest son of politician Frans Van Cauwelaert, and was ordained a priest on 6 August 1939 with the Congregation of the Immaculate Heart of Mary, a Roman Catholic religious institute. On 6 January 1954 he was appointed Apostolic Vicar of the Inongo Diocese in the Democratic Republic of the Congo and Titular Bishop of Metropolis in Asia. He was consecrated on 25 March 1954, and was appointed Bishop of Inongo Diocese on 10 November 1959. He resigned from the governance of that see on 12 June 1967 and was transferred to the titular see of Uccula. When the title of Bishop Emeritus came into use, he resigned on 12 October 1976 from his titular see, becoming Bishop Emeritus of Inongo.

References

External links
 Catholic-Hierarchy

1914 births
2016 deaths
Clergy from Antwerp
Belgian expatriate bishops
20th-century Roman Catholic bishops in the Democratic Republic of the Congo
Participants in the Second Vatican Council
Belgian centenarians
Men centenarians
Belgian expatriates in the Democratic Republic of the Congo
Roman Catholic bishops of Inongo
21st-century Democratic Republic of the Congo people